Ionikos N.F. B.C. is a Greek professional basketball club that is based in Nea Filadelfeia, a suburb of Athens, Greece. The club's full name is Ionikos Neas Filadelfeias Basketball Club (English: Ionian New Philadelphia). The basketball club is a part of A.S. Ionikos Neas Filadelfeias.

History
Ionikos N.F. played in Greece's top-tier level, the Greek Basket League, from 2001 to 2005. In 2004, Ionikos moved to Amaliada, Greece, and was named Ionikos N.F. Amaliada, but the team returned to Nea Filadelfeia, Greece, at the end of the 2004–05 season. In the 2003–04 season, Ionikos played in the European 2nd-tier level EuroCup, and in the 2004–05 season, Ionikos played in the European 3rd-tier level FIBA EuroChallenge.

Arenas
When the club was based in Amaliada, Greece, during the 2004–05 season, they played their home games at the 2,500 seat Amaliada Indoor Hall.

Notable players 

Greece:
  Antonis Asimakopoulos
  Georgios Bosganas
  Periklis Dorkofikis
  Georgios Filippakis
  Georgios Giannouzakos
  Michalis Kakiouzis
  Apostolos Kontos
  Georgios Limniatis
 / Sasa Marcović
  Makis Nikolaidis
  Nikos Papanikolopoulos
  Spyros Panteliadis
  Michalis Perrakis
 / Miloš Šakota
  Vassilis Soulis
  Tzanis Stavrakopoulos
  Aris Tatarounis
  Alexios Tsioumpris
  Nikos Vetoulas

Europe:
  Teoman Alibegović
  Michael Koch
  Mirza Kurtović
  Antti Nikkilä
  Jurica Žuža

Rest of Americas:
  Larry Ayuso

USA:
  Antoine Carr
  Robert Conley
  Tony Dawson
  Eddie Gill
 / Justin Hamilton
  Charles Jones
  Carl Thomas
  Kenyan Weaks

Head coaches

References

External links
Eurobasket.com Team Profile
EuroCup Team Page
FIBA Europe Team Page

Basketball teams in Greece